Coregonus alpinus is a species of freshwater whitefish in the family Salmonidae. It is endemic to Lake Thun, in Switzerland's Interlaken region, where it is found in deep water. It feeds on chironomids and other bottom-dwelling invertebrates. It is known as the kropfer, a name also applied to the probably extinct species Coregonus restrictus.

References
 
 

alpinus
Fish described in 1885
Endemic fauna of Switzerland